Andréa Vanderstukken (born 21 April 1991) is a French badminton player. In 2012, she won the Bill Graham Miami International tournament in women's doubles and mixed doubles events.

Achievements

BWF International Challenge/Series 
Women's doubles

Mixed doubles

  BWF International Challenge tournament
  BWF International Series tournament
  BWF Future Series tournament

References

External links 
 

1991 births
Living people
French female badminton players